Ladmovce is a village and municipality in the Trebišov District in the Košice Region of south-eastern Slovakia.

History
In historical records the village was first mentioned in 1298.

Geography
The village lies at an altitude of 125 metres and covers an area of 11.323 km².
It has a population of about 350 people.

Ethnicity
The village is about 90% Hungarian and 10% Slovak.

Facilities
The village has a public library and a football pitch.
Also a smaller cargo port by the river Bodrog near the village...

External links
https://web.archive.org/web/20080111223415/http://www.statistics.sk/mosmis/eng/run.html

Villages and municipalities in Trebišov District